Mr. Deeds Goes to Town is an American sitcom that aired on ABC from September 26, 1969 to January 16, 1970. It was based on the 1936 film of the same name.

Premise
A small town newspaper editor inherits a large corporation in Manhattan. He then tries to correct problems that his unscrupulous uncle had caused.

Cast
Monte Markham as Longfellow Deeds
Pat Harrington, Jr. as Tony Lawrence
Herb Voland as Henry Masterson
Ivor Barry as George

Episodes

References

External links
 
TV Guide
epguides.com

1969 American television series debuts
1970 American television series endings
1960s American sitcoms
1970s American sitcoms
1960s American workplace comedy television series
1970s American workplace comedy television series
English-language television shows
American Broadcasting Company original programming
Television shows set in New York City
Live action television shows based on films
Television series by Screen Gems